Oof (stylised as OOF) is an art and football magazine, and an associated art gallery. The magazine launched in 2018 and is published twice a year. The gallery opened in 2021, and is located at the Tottenham Hotspur Stadium. The magazine and gallery both showcase football-related visual art.

Magazine

Issue one of Oof magazine was published in February 2018 by Time Out London art critic Eddy Frankel and gallerists Jennie and Justin Hammond. Frankel says that he had tried to keep his passions for art and football separate, until he realised that there were more people in the art world with an interest in football than he had expected. The first issue included an interview with Rose Wylie and features on Chris Ofili and Leo Fitzmaurice. The magazine is published biannually, and aims to use art to explore some of the meaning behind football.

Oof has collaborated with other organisations in the world of art and design. In 2019, Oof organised a five-a-side football tournament between teams from arts organisations including Lisson Gallery, Christie's and Tate. In 2021, Oof partnered with Umbro to produce limited edition artist-designed football shirts with Juno Calypso and Rhys Coren.

Gallery

In the years after the magazine's launch, Oof organised exhibitions of football-related art at venues around London. In 2021 Frankel and Jennie and Justin Hammond opened a permanent exhibition space. Oof Gallery is located in Warmington House, a building entered via the Tottenham Hotspur club shop at the team's London stadium. Tottenham Hotspur have no curatorial say in the gallery's activities.

The gallery aims to be accessible to all. Creative Review described the gallery as "an unpretentious entry point into contemporary art, a world all-too-often shrouded in exclusivity."

The gallery's inaugural exhibition was called Balls and featured works by a range of artists, including new pieces from young artists as well as older work from some of the Young British Artists. Apollo described the art in the exhibition as "terrific", while The New York Times quoted one visitor describing what he saw as a "load of rubbish".

In 2022 the gallery hosted an exhibition of work by photographer Martin Parr and multidisciplinary artist Corbin Shaw, with works themed around the experiences of football fandom.

It is a commercial gallery, with works of art on sale from $10 to $120,000.

References 

Football
Magazines established in 2018
2018 establishments in England
2021 establishments in England
Art galleries established in 2021
Tourist attractions in London
Art museums and galleries in London